Southwestern Idaho is a geographical term for the area along the U.S. state of Idaho's borders with Oregon and Nevada. It includes the populous areas of the Boise metropolitan area and Treasure Valley.

Counties

Cities and towns

External links
Official Idaho travel site
Visit Southwest Idaho

References 

Regions of Idaho